Ayat Rudny Mini-Football Club is a futsal club based in Rudny, a city of Kostanay Province. The club was founded in 1985 and its home court is the Gornyak Sportcomplex with capacity of 1,500 seated spectators.

History 
The club was created under the name "Stroitel" in 1985.

Ayr "Stroitel"s of 1985 — 2002 
In 1989 "Stroitel" takes the second place in Championship of the USSR on five-a-side, in 1995 in Grodno, (Belarus) on the International five-a-side tournament where teams from Poland, Belarus, Ukraine took part, the Stroitel takes the 1st place.

In 1999 in the International five-a-side Championship of the Republic of Kazakhstan among teams of a superleague of "Stroitel" win gold medals, having become the first Champions of the Republic of Kazakhstan in this sport.

In 1999 the Kazakhstan national futzal team from the club "Stroitel" (Talgat Baimuratov, Artem Glebov, Sergey Ilyukhin and Igor Klinov) played in the Championship of Asia (Malaysia) for its first time and taking home the bronze medal. In 2000 — the runner-up (Thailand).

In the 2001-02 season won bronze medal of the championship. The club's next season was extremely unsuccessful. The club season record is 17 out of 19.

After that season the club was disbanded.

Renaissance of club 2007-present 
In 2007 the MFC "Ayat" is created. In 2007 following the results of Championship of Republic of Kazakhstan on a futsal among the first league teams in which 6 teams from all Republic took part the "Ayat" team wins first place and receives the permit in the top division. Same year the "Ayat" for a prize of the President of the Football Union of Kazakhstan on a futsal wins first place in a tournament.

In 2008 participation in the X Republic of Kazakhstan Championship on a futsal among teams of the Premier League of a season of 2007 — 2008 takes the 5th place.

In 2009 in XI Republic of Kazakhstan Championship on a futsal of a season of 2008/2009 the "Ayat" took the 4th place, lagging behind on only 2 points the third place. Two team players were [[Republic of Kazakhstan national team on a futsal Grigory Shamro, Askhat Alzhaksin. Sergey Starovoytov having become the member of youth team of Kazakhstan on a futsal, I participated in a final tournament of the European countries of youth teams, taking place in the city of St. Petersburg. In the same season the youth team of "Ayat-dubl" which showed good performance in the five-a-side Championship of the Kostanay Province was formed having taken 1 place.

In 2010 for the first time in the history of "Ayat", having become the third in draw of the XV Cup on a futsal, I continued a "Bronze" series and in the XIII Championship of the Republic of Kazakhstan on a futsal among teams of the Premier League. Aleksandr Metelkin the legionary from Russia "Ayat" playing in structure is recognized as the top scorer of the Cup and the Republic of Kazakhstan Championship. Five players of club were a part of a national team of Kazakhstan on a futsal: Grigory Shamro, Nikolay Kazakov, Timur Murzabayev, Daniyar Kenzhegulov, Aleksandr Yakimenko.

In a season 2011-12 team takes the 7th place, and in 2013 enters the five of the best.

Performances in Championat of Kazakhstan

Current squad

Honours
 Premier League
 Winners (1):  1998-99
Bronze (4):  2000-01, 2010-11, 2013-14, 2014-15
 Kazakhstani Futsal Cup 
Winners(1): 1999
Bronze (2): 2011, 2014
 Futsal World Tournament (Grodno) 
Winners(1): 1995
 Soviet Futsal Top League 
Runners-up (1): 1989

External links
 MFC Ayat Official Website 

Futsal clubs established in 1985
1985 establishments in the Kazakh Soviet Socialist Republic
Futsal clubs in Kazakhstan